The red-sided ctenotus (Ctenotus pulchellus)  is a species of skink found in the Northern Territory and Queensland in Australia.

References

pulchellus
Reptiles described in 1978
Taxa named by Glen Milton Storr